Unione Sportiva Oratorio Calcio Rudianese (where Calcio indicates the country of the old U.S.O. Calcio) is an Italian association football club located in Rudiano, Lombardy. It currently plays in Promozione Lombardy.

History 
The club was founded in 1961 as A.C.D. Rudianese.

In 2010 it is promoted to Serie D from Eccellenza Lombardy and joins forces with U.S.O. Calcio and A.S.D. Urago D'Oglio, but only in the summer 2011 the merger becomes official refounding its with the current denomination.

After the end of the 2011–12 season, it did not appeal against the exclusion of Federal Council and it is relegated to Promozione Lombardy.

Colors and badge 
The colors of the club are yellow and green.

References

External links
Official homepage

Football clubs in Lombardy
Association football clubs established in 1985
1985 establishments in Italy